Dean A. Nyquist (January 24, 1935 – January 1, 2014) was an American lawyer and politician who served as a member of the Minnesota Senate from 1967 to 1972.

Early life and education 
Born in Brule, Wisconsin, Nyquist received his bachelor's degree in electrical engineering from North Dakota State University and his law degree from William Mitchell College of Law (now the Mitchell Hamline School of Law at Hamline University).

Career 
After earning his undergraduate degree, he worked as an engineer for Honeywell. He lived in Brooklyn Center, Minnesota and served as mayor of the city from 1978 to 1990. During his tenure as mayor, Nyquist did not accept a salary. He also operated a private legal practice for 20 years. Nyquist served in the Minnesota Senate from 1967 to 1972.

Nyquist was the Republican nominee for Attorney General of Minnesota in 1974, losing to Warren Spannaus.

Personal life 
Nyquist and his wife, Marie, were married for 52 years and had three children. Nyquist died on January 1, 2014, in New Hope, Minnesota.

Notes

1935 births
2014 deaths
People from Douglas County, Wisconsin
People from Brooklyn Park, Minnesota
North Dakota State University alumni
William Mitchell College of Law alumni
American electrical engineers
Minnesota lawyers
Mayors of places in Minnesota
Minnesota state senators
20th-century American lawyers